is a town located in Yamanashi Prefecture, Japan. ,  the town had an estimated population of 10,679 in 610 households, and a population density of 28.9 persons per km2. It has the smallest population of any town in Japan. Hayakawa is on the list of The Most Beautiful Villages in Japan, established in 2005.

Geography
Hayakawa is located in far southwestern Yamanashi Prefecture. The Hayakawa River, a tributary of the Fuji River runs through the town. Some 96% of the town's area is covered by forest and mountains.

Neighboring municipalities
Yamanashi Prefecture
Minami-Alps
Minobu
Fujikawa
Shizuoka Prefecture
Aoi-ku, Shizuoka

Climate
The town has a climate characterized by hot and humid summers, and relatively mild winters (Köppen climate classification Cfa).  The average annual temperature in Hayakawa is 13.0 °C. The average annual rainfall is 1655 mm with September as the wettest month. The temperatures are highest on average in August, at around 24.9 °C, and lowest in January, at around 1.5 °C.

Demographics
Per Japanese census data, the population of Hayakawa has declined by more than 80% over the past 50 years. Over 40% of the town population shares the surname of "Mochizuki".

History
During the Edo period, all of Kai Province was tenryō territory under direct control of the Tokugawa shogunate. During the cadastral reform of the early Meiji period, the area was organized into villages under  Minamikoma District, Yamanashi. The town of Hayakawa was created on September 23, 1956 through the merger of six villages of Motivate, Goka, Suzurishima, Miyakogawa, Misato and Nishiyama.

Education
Hayakawa has two public elementary schools and one public junior high school operated by the town government. The village does not have a high school.

Transportation

Railway
The town has no passenger rail service. The nearest train station is Minobu Station on the Minobu Line, with bus services very infrequently.

Highway
Hayakawa is not served by any national highway.

Culture 
Until relatively recently, the village of Narada in Hayakawa was home to a language island known as the Narada dialect. Although the dialect is not in use anymore, it has had an effect on the accents of the current natives of the area.

References

External links

Official Website 

 
Towns in Yamanashi Prefecture